Valentine Derrey (born 13 June 1987) is a French professional golfer. She reached 84 on the Women's World Golf Rankings in 2014 as she won the Turkish Ladies Open and finished seventh on the LET Order of Merit.

Amateur career
Derrey was a nine-year member of the French National Team 2001–2009, three-time winner of the French Junior Championship (2001, 2004, 2005) and 2005 French Cup champion. She was runner-up at the 2004 Girls Amateur Championship. She played collegiate golf with the TCU Horned Frogs at Texas Christian University in Fort Worth where she recorded 11 top-10 finishes including one win.

Professional career
Derrey turned professional in October 2010 and played on the LPGA Futures Tour in 2010 and 2011 where she won the 2011 Tate & Lyle Players Championship. She finished seventh on the season ending 2011 LPGA Futures Tour Money List to gain membership of the LPGA Tour for the 2012 season.

Derrey also joined the Ladies European Tour (LET) in 2011 and recorded twelve top-10 finishes 2012–2017, including runner-up at the Lacoste Ladies Open de France and Hero Women's Indian Open in 2013, and her win in the 2014 Turkish Ladies Open. Her best seasons were 2013 and 2014 where she finished tenth and seventh on the LET Order of Merit rankings respectively. She was ranked 98th on the Women's World Golf Rankings at the end of 2014 after peaking at 84.

Professional wins (5)

Ladies European Tour wins (1)

LPGA Futures Tour wins (1)

LET Access Series wins (3)

Source:

Team appearances
Amateur
European Lady Junior's Team Championship (representing France): 2004
European Ladies' Team Championship (representing France): 2007, 2008, 2009, 2010

References

External links

French female golfers
TCU Horned Frogs women's golfers
Ladies European Tour golfers
LPGA Tour golfers
Golfers from Paris
1987 births
Living people